Crosbyton High School, also known as Crosbyton Secondary, is a public high school located in Crosbyton, Texas (USA) and classified as a 2A school by the UIL. It is part of the Crosbyton Consolidated Independent School District located in Crosby County. In 2015, the school was rated "Met Standard" by the Texas Education Agency.

Athletics
The Crosbyton Chiefs compete in the following sports:

 Baseball
 Basketball
 Cross Country
 Football
 Golf
 Softball
 Tennis
 Track & Field

References

External links
Official Website

Public high schools in Texas
Education in Crosby County, Texas